Iotonchiidae is a family of nematodes belonging to the order Tylenchida.

Genera:
 Fungiotonchium Siddiqi, 1986
 Iotonchium Cobb, 1920
 Paraiotonchium Slobodyanyuk, 1975
 Skarbilovinema Chizhov & Zakharenkova, 1991

References

Nematodes